Kevin Barr is a Canadian politician, who served in the Yukon Legislative Assembly from 2011 to 2016. He represented the electoral district of Mount Lorne-Southern Lakes as a member of the Yukon New Democratic Party caucus. First elected in the 2011 election, he was defeated in the 2016 election by John Streicker of the Yukon Liberal Party.

Political career

Barr first entered politics when he ran unsuccessfully for the New Democrats in the rural Yukon seat of Southern Lakes against incumbent Yukon Party MLA Patrick Rouble in the 2006 Yukon election

He tried again - this time in 2011 - for the Yukon seat in the House of Commons under the New Democrat banner against Liberal incumbent Larry Bagnell in the 2011 federal election. Barr finished in fourth place, trailing Bagnell, Conservative Ryan Leef (who narrowly defeated Bagnell), and Green candidate John Streicker.

Barr sought office again later that year for the Yukon New Democratic Party in the 2011 Yukon territorial election, this time in the newly created rural riding of Mount Lorne-Southern Lakes where he lives. Barr won comfortably.

During the 33rd Legislative Assembly, Barr served as New Democrat Caucus Chair, as well as caucus critic for Community Services, Tourism and Culture, the Yukon Liquor Corporation, and the Child and Youth Advocate. In office, Barr was a vocal opponent to fracking in the Yukon. In December 2015, he also presented a petition to establish National Aboriginal Day as a new statutory holiday in the territory.

Barr announced his intent to seek re-election in Mount Lorne-Southern Lakes in the 2016 Yukon election, but was defeated narrowly in the campaign by now-Yukon Liberal John Streicker, who had placed ahead of Barr in the 2011 federal election. Streicker defeated Barr by just 14 votes; one of the closest that election. Barr was one of the four New Democrat incumbents to lose their seat in that campaign, in which the New Democrats was reduced to third party status.

Personal life

Prior to his term in the legislature, Barr was a community worker in Whitehorse and Carcross, and a musician with the band Undertakin' Daddies (which was a nominee for the Juno Award for Roots & Traditional Album of the Year – Group).

He currently lives in Crag Lake, Yukon.

Electoral record

Yukon general election, 2016

|-

| Liberal
| John Streicker
| align="right"| 451
| align="right"| 38.5%
| align="right"| +27.9%
|-

| NDP
| Kevin Barr
| align="right"| 437
| align="right"| 37.3%
| align="right"| -9.5%

|-
! align left colspan=3|Total
! align=right| 1172
! align=right| 100.0%
! align=right| –
|}

Yukon general election, 2011

Canadian federal election, 2011

Yukon general election, 2006

|-

| NDP
| Kevin Barr
| align="right"| 238
| align="right"| 36.6%
| align="right"| +3.2%

| Liberal
| Ethel Tizya
| align="right"| 134
| align="right"| 20.6%
| align="right"| +2.0%
|-
! align=left colspan=3|Total
! align=right| 651
! align=right| 100.0%
! align=right| –
|}

References

Yukon New Democratic Party MLAs
Living people
People from Carcross, Yukon
Canadian country musicians
21st-century Canadian politicians
First Nations politicians
Musicians from Yukon
Year of birth missing (living people)